David Thorn Payne (born July 24, 1982) is an American hurdler. He was born in Cincinnati and his family moved to the suburb of Wyoming in Ohio. Payne competed in the 110 and 400 meter hurdles while attending the University of Cincinnati.  While at UC, Payne won multiple individual titles in Conference USA and was named Conference USA Outdoor Athlete of the Year while guiding the Bearcats to the C-USA 2004 outdoor title.  He set school records for both distances and was a two time NCAA All-American in the 110m hurdles.  Payne now resides in Northern Kentucky and trains in Cincinnati, Ohio.

In 2007 he won the silver medal at the Pan American Games behind Dayron Robles, and the bronze medal at the 2007 World Championships, the latter in a personal best time of 13.02 seconds.  This feat was especially surprising since Payne was filling in, as an alternate, for the injured American record holder, Dominique Arnold, and had only arrived in Japan from the U.S. less than 24 hours before he was to race.

Payne grabbed the final qualifying spot for the Beijing Olympics at the 2008 Outdoor National Championships.  At the 2008 Olympics in Beijing, China, Payne continued his ascent in the track and field world and won a Silver Medal in the 110m hurdles in a season best time of 13.17 seconds. World record holder Dayron Robles, of Cuba, won the gold.

In 2009, after sitting out most of the indoor season, Payne returned to Olympic form during the outdoor season capturing the 2009 USATF National Championship in the 110m hurdles, a feat which qualified him for the 2009 World Championships in Berlin, Germany.  In a photo finish, Payne edged out fellow 2008 Olympian, 2007 World Silver Medalist, and former 110m hurdle National Champion Terrence Trammell by 0.003 of a second with a winning time of 13.115.  Again, Payne surprised many by overtaking Trammell in the final steps although Trammell led coming off the final hurdle and was thought by the announcers to have won.

References

External links 
 
 
 
 
 
 

1982 births
Living people
American male hurdlers
Athletes (track and field) at the 2007 Pan American Games
Athletes (track and field) at the 2008 Summer Olympics
Olympic silver medalists for the United States in track and field
African-American male track and field athletes
People from Wyoming, Ohio
Track and field athletes from Cincinnati
World Athletics Championships medalists
Medalists at the 2008 Summer Olympics
Pan American Games silver medalists for the United States
Pan American Games medalists in athletics (track and field)
Medalists at the 2007 Pan American Games
21st-century African-American sportspeople
20th-century African-American people